The Town of Croydon was a local government area for the governance of Croydon, Queensland, Australia. It existed from 1892 to 1908.

History
The Borough of Croydon was established in 1868 as a municipal council for Croydon.

With the passing of the Local Authorities Act 1902, on 31 March 1903 the Borough of Croydon became the Town of Croydon.

On 19 December 1908, the Town of Croydon was absorbed into the surrounding Shire of Croydon.

Croydon Town Hall

The Croydon Town Hall was believed to be built about 1892 as a town hall. It is located on the northern side of Samwell Street, right to the right of the intersection with Temple Street. In the 1960s the town hall became the headquarters of the Croydon Shire Council until 1991 when the shire built new offices of the other side of Samwell Street. The building was listed on the Queensland Heritage Register on 11 June 1996.

Mayors 
The mayors of the Town of Croydon were:

 1892: H.F. Morgan
 1893: J.W. Chandler
 1894-1895: J.M. Temple
 1896: T.P.V. Tabart
 1897-1898: James Rogers
 1899: Charles Maslen
 1900: A. Morrison
1901: Edward P. Barnett
1902: A. Morrison
1903: T.H. Waldie
1904-1907: Vincent Creagh
1908: G . Pass

References

External links
 

Former local government areas of Queensland
1868 establishments in Australia
1908 disestablishments in Australia
Croydon, Queensland